The blueberry tea  is a cocktail made from tea and liqueurs. It is served hot and could be considered a variant on the hot toddy. Its name derives from its fruity taste, which some compare to blueberries.

Preparation
A blueberry tea is usually served in a brandy snifter, to concentrate and hold the alcohol fumes released by the tea's heat.   Ingredients are typically
 1 oz. Grand Marnier liqueur
 1 oz. Amaretto liqueur
 Hot Orange pekoe tea to taste.

Preparation is simple -- Add both liqueurs to the snifter and then fill with hot tea to taste.  Swaddle the brandy snifter in serviettes or a cloth to protect the hands.  Some suggest a sugared rim, or adding sugar to the tea, or a lemon garnish.

Variations
 Made with Earl Grey tea instead of Orange pekoe.
 Made with actual blueberry fruit tea or other herbal tea, and less Grand Marnier
 Full moon #2, blueberry tea without the tea

See also
 List of cocktails
 Hot toddy

References

Cocktails with liqueur
Blueberries